Dsup (contraction of damage suppressor) is a DNA-associating protein, unique to the tardigrade, that suppresses the occurrence of DNA breaks by radiation. When human HEK293 cells were engineered with Dsup proteins, they showed approximately 40% more tolerance against X-ray radiation.

Tardigrades can withstand 1,000 times more radiation than other animals,  median lethal doses of 5,000 Gy (of gamma rays) and 6,200 Gy (of heavy ions) in hydrated animals (5 to 10 Gy could be fatal to a human). The only explanation found in earlier experiments for this ability was that their lowered water state provides fewer reactants for ionizing radiation. However, subsequent research found that tardigrades, when hydrated, still remain highly resistant to shortwave UV radiation in comparison to other animals, and that one factor for this is their ability to efficiently repair damage to their DNA resulting from that exposure. A landmark study on Dsup protein showed that it can bind nucleosomes in the cell and protect DNA.

The Dsup protein has been tested on other animal cells. Using a culture of human cells that express the Dsup protein, it was found that after X-ray exposure the cells had fewer DNA breaks than control cells.

Function and structure 
The Dsup from Ramazzottius varieornatus is mainly used for study, since it is one of the most stress-tolerant species. Orthologous versions of Dsup are also found in Hypsibius exemplaris (OQV24709). Dsup does not exhibit a lot of secondary structure, save for the helix in the middle. The C-terminal half contains an NLS, and this Ala/Gly-rich half is sufficient for DNA binding. It is probably mostly disordered, but it has a lot of positive charge.

Dsup is known to bind to free DNA, but it binds more tightly to nucleosomes, the typical packed form of DNA in eukaryotic cells. Its nucleosome binding domain is vaguely similar to the one in HMGN proteins.

Molecular dynamic simulation of Dsup in complex with DNA shows that it is an intrinsically disordered protein. Its flexibility and electrostatic charge helps it bind to DNA and form aggregates.

References 

Animal proteins
DNA-binding proteins
Tardigrades